Qu Xiaoming (born 8 December 1986) is a Chinese rower. He competed in the men's eight event at the 2008 Summer Olympics.

References

1986 births
Living people
Chinese male rowers
Olympic rowers of China
Rowers at the 2008 Summer Olympics
Asian Games medalists in rowing
Rowers at the 2010 Asian Games
Asian Games gold medalists for China
Medalists at the 2010 Asian Games
Rowers from Dalian
20th-century Chinese people
21st-century Chinese people